The  is a concrete gravity-arch dam located in Kumano, Mie Prefecture, Japan. The dam crosses the Kitayama River, a tributary of the Kumano River near the border of Mie Prefecture with Wakayama Prefecture.

The dam was constructed by Obayashi Corporation, with construction starting in 1963, and completed by 1965. It is currently owned maintained by the Electric Power Development Company. The reservoir behind the dam also serves as a pumped storage facility in conjunction with neighboring Ikehara Dam in Wakayama.

References 

Dams completed in 1965
Energy infrastructure completed in 1965
Dams in Mie Prefecture
Gravity dams
Hydroelectric power stations in Japan